Lucy Morris Chaffee Alden (Chaffee; November 20, 1836 - December 20, 1912) was a 19th-century American author, educator, and hymnwriter of the long nineteenth century. Over 200 of her works  appeared in various periodicals.

Biography
Lucy Morris Chaffee was born in South Wilbraham, New Hampden, Massachusetts, November 20, 1836. Her parents were Daniel Davis and Sarah Flynt Chaffee. Among her maternal ancestors was Judge John Bliss, of South Wilbraham, who on April 8, 1775, was appointed sole committee "to repair to Connecticut to request that Colony to co-operate with Massachusetts for the general defense", and who, under the constitution was chosen to the first and several succeeding senates. Alden spent a year at Monson Academy. There was a sister, Catherine Newell Chaffee (1835-1873).

For 10 years, Alden taught school, and for three years, she served as a member of the school board of her native town. She was left alone by the death of her mother in 1884. In July 1890, she married Lucius David Alden (1835-1898), an early schoolmate who had relocated to the Pacific coast, but she continued to live at her father's homestead. Her poetic, and far more numerous prose, writings appeared in various newspapers of Springfield, Boston, Chicago, and Minneapolis, in several Sunday school songbooks, and in quarterly and monthly journals. One doctrinal pamphlet of hers was translated by a British officer and missionary in Madras into Hindi, and many copies printed. Copies of another were voluntarily distributed by a county judge in Florida among members of his state legislature. In 1891, under an appropriation, made by an association whose conferences reached from Maine to California, of a sum to be distributed among writers of meritorious articles, Alden was selected to write for Massachusetts.

Lucy Morris Chaffee Alden died in Hampden, Massachusetts, December 20, 1912, and is buried at Old Hampden Cemetery in Hampden, Massachusetts.

Poetical quotation
We court the friendships thou has wrought,
The charms thy loves can lend,
Till many a form thy fruitful thought
Seems like our household friend.

Selected works
 The "one hope" : Ephesians 4:4, 1886 
 A Letter to Ministers: An Affectionate Entreaty, 1887
 Scriptural philosophy of the atonement : what did Christ purchase?, 1887
 A criticism on an editorial in the Congregationalist, entitled Christ's view, 1888
 Letter to every Christian missionary, 1888
 The Soul, what is It? A Scripture Reply : what is the Spirit in Man? : Let the Scriptures Answer, 1888
 The doctrine of immortality : a letter to ministers, 1900

Hymns

Comes each day the guest unbidden
How great was thine honor, O Bethlehem
I follow the footsteps that guide
I would be a little pilgrim
Jesus, Jesus, dying Lamb
Jesus knows a child's temptations
Lord, sing with us our hymn of praise
Loyal to Jesus forever
O blessed the day
Obedient to thy sacred word
Once more over Jordan the Master has passed
Praise to God, glory today, All his works
Take me, Jesus, Jesus take me
Though the cloud that hid our Savior	Lucy Morris
To my dying child, O Master
''Up, soldiers of Jesus

References

Bibliography

External links
 
 

1836 births
1912 deaths
19th-century American writers
19th-century American women writers
19th-century American women musicians
People from Hampden, Massachusetts
Writers from Massachusetts
Educators from Massachusetts
American women educators
School board members in Massachusetts
American Protestant hymnwriters
American women hymnwriters
American women non-fiction writers
Wikipedia articles incorporating text from A Woman of the Century